Caras & Bocas (English: Watercolors of Love) is a Brazilian telenovela produced and broadcast by TV Globo, which premiered on 13 April 2009 and ended on 8 January 2010. It was the second-most watched telenovela in Brazil.

Cast

Soundtrack

National
Cover: The telenovela logo

 "Caras e Bocas" - Chicas
 "C'est si bon" - Rita Lee and Roberto de Carvalho
 "Meu Sonho" - Os Paralamas do Sucesso
 "Quando" - Myllena
 "Um Dia De Domingo" - Ana Carolina and Celso Fonseca
 "Mais Uma Vez" - Marisa Monte
 "Vem Andar Comigo" - Jota Quest
 "É só você" querer – Elba Ramalho
 "Simplesmente Mulher" - Silvia Machete
 "Saudade da Bahia" - Moinho
 "Vem Na Minha" - Kelly Key
 "Amor Perfeito" - Gé Cardoso e Lilach Davioff
 "Nada Além" - Roberto Frejat
 "No Ordinary Love" - João Pinheiro
 "Antes De Você" - Titãs
 "Vida" - Padre Fábio de Melo
 "Te Amo" - Wanderléa
 "De Volta Ao Planeta dos Macacos" - Jota Quest
 "Além do Paraíso" - Jussara Silveira

International
Cover: Flávia Alessandra

 "Lucky" - Jason Mraz feat. Colbie Caillat
 "Already Gone" - Kelly Clarkson
 "Don't Wanna Miss" - Lia Weller
 "The Fear" - Lily Allen
 "Stand by Me" - Seal
 "No Other Love" - John Legend feat. Estelle
 "Funky Bahia" - Sérgio Mendes part. will.i.am
 "Fell In Love" - Alain Clark
 "Invece no" - Laura Pausini
 "If" - Daniel Boaventura
 "Ahava" (É o Amor) – Gê and Lilaz
 "I'll be there" - Av Project feat. Itauana Ciribelli and Dan Torres
 "Your Heart Is As Black As Night" - Melody Gardot
 "Lovin' You" - Rosanah Fiengo
 "Bewitched" - Ronaldo Canto e Mello
 "All about our Love" - João Pinheiro feat. Marjorie Philibert

Instrumental
 "Tango moo"
 "Chapliniana"
 "Frederico"
 "Na Galeria (suspense)"
 "Caretas 1"
 "Caretas 2"
 "Afrika 1"
 "Afrika 2"
 "Afrika 3"
 "No Boteco"
 "Ongsong"
 "Judaica moo"
 "Judaica moo (suspense)"
 "Mitzva Party"

References

External links

2009 telenovelas
2009 Brazilian television series debuts
2010 Brazilian television series endings
Brazilian telenovelas
TV Globo telenovelas
Comedy telenovelas
Telenovelas by Walcyr Carrasco
Brazilian LGBT-related television shows
Portuguese-language telenovelas
Television series about monkeys